Kyzyl-Uraan is a village in Jalal-Abad Region of Kyrgyzstan. It is part of the Toktogul District. Its population was 3,109 in 2021.

References
 

Populated places in Jalal-Abad Region